Derryl J. McLaren (born March 22, 1949) is an American politician in the state of Iowa.

McLaren was born in Shenandoah, Iowa. He attended Iowa State University and is a farmer. He served Iowa Senate from 1991 to 2001, as a Republican (47th district from 1991 to 1993 and 43rd district from 1993 to 2001).

References

1949 births
Living people
People from Shenandoah, Iowa
Iowa State University alumni
Farmers from Iowa
Republican Party Iowa state senators